Islam is an Abrahamic monotheistic religion teaching that there is only one God (Allah) and that Muhammad is the last messenger of God. It is the world's second-largest religion, with over 1.9 billion followers, and Muslims form 24.4% of the world's population.

Common iconography

Colours

History 
Early Islamic armies and caravans flew simple solid-coloured flags (generally black or white) for identification purposes, with the exception of the Young Eagle of Muḥammad, which had the shahada inscribed upon it. In later generations, the Muslim leaders continued to use a simple black, white, or green flag with no markings, writings, or symbolism on it. The Umayyads fought under white and gold banners. The Abbasids chose black (blue) and fought with black banners. The Fatimids used a green standard, as well as white. The Saudi Emirate of Diriyah used a white and green flag with the shahada emblazoned on it. Various countries in the Persian Gulf have red flags. The four Pan-Arab colours, white, black, green and red, dominate the flags of Arab states.

Meanings 

  Green – The silk and pillows of Jannah are believed to be green.
  White – Considered the purest and cleanest color in Islam and the color of the flag of Muḥammad, the Young Eagle.
  Black – The color of Jahannam as well as the color of the Black Standard.

Black Standard

The Black Standard is one of the flags flown by Muhammad in Muslim tradition. It was historically used by Abu Muslim in his uprising leading to the Abbasid Revolution in 747 and is also associated with the Abbasid Caliphate. It is also a symbol and is associated with Islamic eschatology (heralding the advent of the Mahdi). The Black Banner, which is different from the flag used by ISIL. Scholars have interpreted ISIL's use of a similar black flag in attempts to their claim to re-establishing a Caliphate.

Other symbols

Star and Crescent 

The crescent is usually associated with Islam and regarded as its symbol. The crescent and star symbol became strongly associated with the Ottoman Empire in the 19th century. By extension from the use in Ottoman lands, It became a symbol also for Islam as a whole, as well as representative of western Orientalism. "Crescent and Star" was used as a metaphor for the rule of the Islamic empires (Ottoman and Persian) in the late 19th century in British literature. This association was apparently strengthened by the increasingly ubiquitous fashion of using the crescent and star symbol in the ornamentation of Ottoman mosques and minarets. By contrast, the majority of religious Islamic publications emphasize that the crescent is rejected "by some Muslim scholars". The "Red Crescent" emblem was adopted by volunteers of the International Committee of the Red Cross (ICRC) as early as 1877 during the Russo-Turkish War; it was officially adopted in 1929.

After the collapse of the Ottoman Empire in 1922, the crescent and star was used in several national flags adopted by its successor states. In 1947, after the independence of Pakistan, flag of Pakistan was white crescent and star with a green background. The crescent and star in the flag of the Kingdom of Libya (1951) was explicitly given an Islamic interpretation by associating it with "the story of Hijra (migration) of our Prophet Mohammed" By the 1950s, this symbolism was embraced by movements of Arab nationalism such as the proposed Arab Islamic Republic (1974).

Rub el Hizb 
The Rub el Hizb is used to facilitate recitation of the Quran. The symbol determines every quarter of Hizb, while the Hizb is one half of a juz'. The symbol is also found on a number of emblems and flags, such as that of the Marinid Sultanate.

Khatim 

Seal of the Prophets (Khatim) a title used in the Qur'an and by Muslims to designate Muhammad as the last of the prophets sent by God.

Shahadah 

Shahadah is one of the Five Pillars of Islam and part of the Adhan. It reads: "I bear witness that none deserves worship except God, and I bear witness that Muhammad is the messenger of God."

Religious flags with inscriptions were in use in the medieval period, as shown in miniatures by 13th-century illustrator Yahya ibn Mahmud al-Wasiti. 14th-century illustrations of the History of the Tatars by Hayton of Corycus (1243) shows both Mongols and Seljuqs using a variety of war ensigns.

The symbolic values of numbers 

 The number 1 symbolizes the Shahada of Muslims: "There is no god but Allah and Muhammad is the messenger of Allah."
 The number 4 is a very important number in Islam with many significations: Eid-al-Adha lasts for four days from the 10th to the 14th of Dhul Hijja; there were four Caliphs; there were four Archangels; there are four months in which war is not permitted in Islam; when a woman's husband dies she is to wait for four months and ten days; the Rub el Hizb is composed of quadrilaterals.
 The number 8 in Islam symbolizes the eight angels that carry the throne of Allah in Jannah (heaven).
 The number 3 is also significant as many sunnah acts are advised to be done in three's.

See also
 Islamic flags

References

Notes

Citations

External links